Laurențiu Manole (born 7 January 1997) is a Romanian professional footballer who plays for Dacia Unirea Brăila.

Manole was born in Bucharest and played youth football with Dinamo București, winning the Juniori B youth league in 2014, before starting his professional career with the club's senior team.

On 24 September 2015, he made his debut for Dinamo's senior squad in a 6th round Cupa României 2–3 win away at Dacia Unirea Brăila, before starting his half season long loan spell at FC Brașov in February 2016.

Career statistics

References

External links 

1997 births
Living people
Footballers from Bucharest
Romanian footballers
Association football midfielders
Liga I players
Liga II players
FC Dinamo București players
FC Brașov (1936) players
Sepsi OSK Sfântu Gheorghe players
CS Gaz Metan Mediaș players
FC Voluntari players
ACS Viitorul Târgu Jiu players
CS Sportul Snagov players
FC Dunărea Călărași players
AFC Dacia Unirea Brăila players